Sunken Island, also known as Hutters Island, is a sunken island on Otsego Lake in Otsego County, New York. Sunken Island is several feet below the surface of the lake and is marked with 4 buoys to prevent boats from running aground. Sunken Island is described in the writings of James Fenimore Cooper upon which a structure once stood.

References

External links 
Sunken Island at hmdb.org

Islands of New York (state)
Islands of Otsego County, New York